There are several streams and communities in the U.S. state of Pennsylvania named Mill Run, including:

 Mill Run (Neshannock Creek tributary), in Mercer County
 Mill Run (Susquehanna River tributary), in Wyoming County

 Mill Run, Blair County, Pennsylvania, census-designated place
 Mill Run, Fayette County, Pennsylvania, closest settlement to Frank Lloyd Wright's Fallingwater